Mand-e Sofla (also Romanized as Mand-e Soflá; also known as Kontekī and Mand-e Pā’īn) is a village in Jolgeh-ye Chah Hashem Rural District, Jolgeh-ye Chah Hashem District, Dalgan County, Sistan and Baluchestan Province, Iran. At the 2006 census, its population was 598, in 125 families.

References 

Populated places in Dalgan County